The Joshua Reed Giddings Law Office is a historic commercial building at 102 East Jefferson Street in Jefferson, Ohio.  Built in 1823, it was the law office of Joshua Reed Giddings (1795-1864), a prominent abolitionist who served as a U.S. representative from 1838 to 1859.  The building was recognized as a National Historic Landmark for Giddings' role in the slavery debates preceding the American Civil War.  It is now owned by the local historical society, and is a museum open by appointment.

Description and history
The Joshua Read Giddings Law Office is located east of downtown Jefferson, on the south side of East Jefferson Street, across from the Jefferson Baptist Church and next to a small public park called Giddings Park.  It is a small single-story wood-frame structure, covered by a gabled roof and finished in wooden clapboards.  The front facade has the main entrance on the right and a window on the left; a similar arrangement is on the back as well.  The doorway is flanked by slender pilasters and topped by a corniced entablature.  The building has simple corner boards, which rise to a narrow entablature; the gable above is fully pedimented.  The interior of the building consists of a single chamber.

The building was constructed in 1823.  From 1838 to 1859 it served as the law office of Joshua Reed Giddings.  Giddings was a vocal abolitionist, who pressed debates on slavery during his service in the United States House of Representatives.  His radical pronouncements earned him the censure of Congress for violating the body's gag rule forbidding discussion of slavery.  Giddings is believed to a significant effect on the antislavery stance of President Abraham Lincoln.

The building is now a museum owned and operated by the Ashtabula County Historical Society.  Originally located next to Giddings' house on North Chestnut Street, it was moved to its present location in 2013.

See also
List of National Historic Landmarks in Ohio

References

External links

Ashtabula County Historical Society

Buildings and structures in Ashtabula County, Ohio
National Register of Historic Places in Ashtabula County, Ohio
Commercial buildings completed in 1823
National Historic Landmarks in Ohio
Federal architecture in Ohio
Museums in Ashtabula County, Ohio
History museums in Ohio
Historic American Buildings Survey in Ohio
1823 establishments in Ohio
Law offices
Legal history of Ohio